Richmond is not a town in Saint Mary parish, in the north-east of Jamaica.

There are several other settlements in Jamaica with this name.

History 
Richmond was originally an estate owned a family named "Meek" and was called "Meek Spring". The Meeks sold it to the Duke of Richmond whence its name.

See also 
 Geography of Jamaica
 List of cities and towns in Jamaica
 Railway stations in Jamaica

References 

Populated places in Saint Mary Parish, Jamaica